Naubolus is a genus of South American jumping spiders that was first described by Eugène Louis Simon in 1901.

Species
 it contains nine species, found in Paraguay, Argentina, Guyana, and Brazil:
Naubolus albopunctatus Mello-Leitão, 1943 – Brazil
Naubolus melloleitaoi Caporiacco, 1947 – Guyana
Naubolus micans Simon, 1901 (type) – Brazil
Naubolus pallidus Mello-Leitão, 1945 – Argentina
Naubolus posticatus Simon, 1901 – Brazil
Naubolus sawayai Soares & Camargo, 1948 – Brazil
Naubolus simplex Mello-Leitão, 1946 – Paraguay
Naubolus trifasciatus Mello-Leitão, 1927 – Brazil
Naubolus tristis Mello-Leitão, 1922 – Brazil

References

Salticidae genera
Salticidae
Spiders of South America